

Gmina Namysłów is an urban-rural gmina (administrative district) in Namysłów County, Opole Voivodeship, in south-western Poland.

Villages
Apart from the town of Namysłów, Gmina Namysłów contains the villages and settlements of Baldwinowice, Barzyna, Bławaciska, Borek, Brzezinka, Brzozowiec, Bukowa Śląska, Głuszyna, Grabówka, Hałderze, Igłowice, Jastrzębie, Józefków, Kamienna, Karolówka, Kowalowice, Krasowice, Krzemieniec, Łączany, Ligota Książęca, Ligotka, Marysin, Michalice, Mikowice, Minkowskie, Młynek, Młyńskie Stawy, Niwki, Nowe Smarchowice, Nowy Dwór, Nowy Folwark, Objazda, Pawłowice Namysłowskie, Piękna Studnia, Pod Jedlinką, Przeczów, Rychnów, Rychnów Dolny, Smarchowice Małe, Smarchowice Śląskie, Smarchowice Wielkie, Smogorzów, Stanek, Staszków, Winniki, Woskowice Małe, Wszemil, Wszeradów, Żaba, Żabiak, Żabka, Zielony Dąb and Ziemiełowice.

Neighbouring gminas
Gmina Namysłów is bordered by the gminas of Bierutów, Domaszowice, Dziadowa Kłoda, Jelcz-Laskowice, Lubsza, Perzów, Rychtal, Świerczów and Wilków.

Twin towns – sister cities

Gmina Namysłów is twinned with:

 Hlučín, Czech Republic
 Kisköre, Hungary

 Nebelschütz, Germany
 Yaremche, Ukraine
 Zagon, Romania

References

Namyslow
Namysłów County